The 2009 Women's Premier Soccer League season is the 13th season of the WPSL.

Changes From 2008

Name Changes 
Two teams changed their name in the offseason.

New Franchises 
Ten franchises joined the league this year:

Folding 
Seven teams left the league prior to the beginning of the season:
Albuquerque Lady Asylum
Brevard County Cocoa Expos
Colorado Springs United
Massachusetts Stingers - previously on hiatus
Northampton Laurels
Orlando Falcons - previously on hiatus
Sonoma County Sol

Standings
As of July 6, 2009

Pacific Conference

North Division

* California and Walnut Creek game postponed, not rescheduled since it would not affect standings.

South Division

Big Sky Conference

North Division

South Division

Sunshine Conference

Midwest Conference

East Conference

Playoffs

Eastern Conference

Big Sky Conference

Midwest/Sunshine Conferences

Pacific Conference

WPSL Championship

References

External links
 WPSL Standings

Women's Premier Soccer League seasons
2